Moran is a city in southeast Shackelford County, Texas, United States. The population was 270 at the 2010 census.

Geography 

Moran is located at  (32.545945, –99.166275). The town is situated at the intersection of Texas State Highway 6 and Farm to Market 576 approximately 15 miles southeast of Albany, 18 miles northwest of Cisco, 29 miles southwest of Breckenridge, and 42 miles east-northeast of Abilene. Nearby creeks include Deep Creek, Post Oak Creek, Battle Creek, and Hubbard Creek.

According to the United States Census Bureau, the city has a total area of 0.4 square mile (1.1 km2), all land.

History 

Pioneers came to this area as early as the 1860s. During the Civil War (1861–1865), they built the temporary fortress settlement of Mugginsville on Deep Creek 5 miles north of the future town site of Moran. At one time, a branch of the Western Cattle Trail passed nearby. Population increased after the arrival of the Texas Central Railroad in 1881. Hulltown, the original name of the town, was established by Mary and George Washington "Swope" Hull of McDowell, Virginia, who opened a general store at the rail crossing on Deep Creek in 1883. Hull (1849–1911) was the first postmaster. He bought 160 acres between Post Oak and Deep Creeks and platted a town site in March 1884 (he and his family would later move to Oakland, California). Most of the property was bought by Bem Scott, a real estate developer from Indiana, who eventually sold his interests in 1890 to Matthew D. Bray (1845–1926), a prominent local merchant and landowner. For unknown reasons, the town's name was changed to Hicks in 1890. Later, in order to secure a new railroad depot, the town was renamed a third and final time to Moran in 1892 for Texas Central Railroad owner Charles Moran of New York.

By 1900, the community had several businesses, a school and Baptist, Church of Christ, Cumberland Presbyterian, and Methodist congregations. A newspaper was begun in 1895 and bank in 1902. In November 1910, the Cottle No. 1 natural gas well discovery opened the nearby Moran Field, and was the first commercial gas well completed in this vast west Texas area. In the spring of 1911, gas was piped to Moran for residential and business use. Within two years (in 1913) the cities of Albany, Cisco, and Abilene were supplied for the first time with natural gas. By October 1913, with five producing gas wells, the Moran Field won recognition as one of the most important sources of fossil fuels in Texas. For the next fifteen years, oil and gas discoveries in the area made Moran a boom town with a peak population of 5,000–10,000 at one point in the 1920s. By the 1930s, the boom was over and the population gradually began its decline to the present day. Note: much of the information above comes from the local historical markers to the town and to the Cottle No. 1 gas well.

In the late 1980s, Moran achieved fame as the home of the National Fajita Cook-off, which brought thousands of visitors from all over the world to the sleepy town. In the 2000s, Moran became home to Slide Fire Solutions, a multi-million dollar bump stock production company. The local economy remains tied to farming, ranching, and oil and gas production.

Local Texas historical markers are devoted to: Moran (#3468), Cottle No. 1 Natural Gas Well (#1076), Granville E. Waters (#13204), Moran Cemetery (#17708), and Moran Church of Christ (#17SF02).

Demographics

2020 census

As of the 2020 United States census, there were 226 people, 96 households, and 72 families residing in the city.

2000 census
As of the census of 2000, there were 233 people, 97 households, and 67 families residing in the city. The population density was 539.0 people per square mile (209.2/km2). There were 146 housing units at an average density of 337.7/sq mi (131.1/km2). The racial makeup of the city was 98.28% White, 0.86% from other races, and 0.86% from two or more races. Hispanic or Latino of any race were 4.72% of the population.

There were 97 households, out of which 24.7% had children under the age of 18 living with them, 54.6% were married couples living together, 11.3% had a female householder with no husband present, and 29.9% were non-families. 29.9% of all households were made up of individuals, and 15.5% had someone living alone who was 65 years of age or older. The average household size was 2.40 and the average family size was 2.90.

In the city, the population was spread out, with 22.7% under the age of 18, 6.0% from 18 to 24, 23.6% from 25 to 44, 26.6% from 45 to 64, and 21.0% who were 65 years of age or older. The median age was 43 years. For every 100 females, there were 89.4 males. For every 100 females age 18 and over, there were 87.5 males.

The median income for a household in the city was $23,750, and the median income for a family was $28,250. Males had a median income of $19,583 versus $31,250 for females. The per capita income for the city was $11,669. About 11.9% of families and 22.4% of the population were below the poverty line, including 40.5% of those under the age of eighteen and 13.5% of those 65 or over.

Education
The City of Moran is served by the Moran Independent School District. The school's mascot is the bulldog and the school colors are purple and gold.

Museum
The Moran Historical Museum, established in 1979 by the Moran Historical Society, has several displays of memorabilia devoted to the town's past. It is located in the restored former Moran Church of Christ building near the City Park.

References

Cities in Texas
Cities in Shackelford County, Texas